Dimitrios Kostakos (born 8 March 1978) is a Greek fencer. He competed in the team sabre event at the 2004 Summer Olympics.

References

1978 births
Living people
Greek male fencers
Olympic fencers of Greece
Fencers at the 2004 Summer Olympics